This article contains the discography of Finnish rapper Cheek and includes information relating to his album and single releases.

Albums

DVDs 
 2009: Jare Henrik Tiihonen

Singles 

Other charted songs

Featured in

References

Hip hop discographies
Discographies of Finnish artists